Demirci Hüyük is an excavated settlement in ancient northwestern Anatolia dating from the early Bronze Age.

Luwian connections 

Linguist Craig Melchert suggested that the Luwians were related to Demirci Hüyük culture, implying entry into Anatolia from ancient Thrace circa 3000 BC. A competing although highly problematic theory is that the Luwians are related to Kura–Araxes culture (located in presentday Armenia and Georgia). The Kura-Araxes culture has no cultural relation to Indo-European cultures of Europe and Asia.

See also

 Limantepe
 Troy

References

Bibliography

 Firth, Richard. 2012. The textile tools of Demircihüyük. In KOSMOS: Jewellery, adornment and textiles in the Aegean Bronze Age, Marie-Louise Nosch & Robert Laffineur (eds.), 131–138. Peeters: Liège, Belgium.
 Korfmann, Manfred. 1983. Demircihüyük: Die Ergebnisse der Ausgrabungen 1975-1978. P. von Zabern.

Former populated places in Turkey